Carsten Schneider (born 23 January 1976) is a German politician of the Social Democratic Party who has been serving as a member of the German Parliament since 1998. Since 2021, he has also been serving as Parliamentary State Secretary for East Germany and Equivalent Living Conditions in Chancellor Olaf Scholz's cabinet.

From 2017 until 2021, Schneider  was the First Secretary of his party's parliamentary group, in this position assisting the group's successive chairs Andrea Nahles (2017–2019) and Rolf Mützenich (2019–2021).

Early life 
After graduating from Wilhelm-Häßler-Gymnasium in Erfurt, Thuringia he accepted a position at an Erfurt savings bank after completing his alternative civilian service in 1998.

Schneider has been married since 2003 and has two daughters.

Political career 
Schneider joined the SPD freewillingly in 1995. He became active in Young Socialists in the SPD and eventually was elected chairman of the Thuringian chapter. Until 2017, he also belonged to the leadership of the SPD in Thuringia.

In the 1998 federal elections, at age 22, Schneider became the then-youngest representative in the German Parliament, representing Erfurt from 1998 to 2005 and the successor constituency of Erfurt – Weimar – Weimarer Land II since 2005. He was a member of the Budget Committee, where he served as his parliamentary group's rapporteur on the budgets of the Federal Ministry of Education and Research and the Office of the Federal President. He is also a member of the Thuringian SPD parliamentary caucus, of which he became speaker in 2005.

In 2012, Schneider was selected as one of three speakers of the Seeheim Circle.

In the negotiations to form a Grand Coalition of the Christian Democrats (CDU together with the Bavarian CSU) and the Social Democrats (SPD) following the 2013 federal elections, Schneider was part of the SPD delegation in the working group on financial policies and the national budget, led by Wolfgang Schäuble and Olaf Scholz. He had previously publicly expressed his doubts about the Social Democrats joining a coalition government with the CDU/CSU, having preferred a coalition with the center-left Alliance '90/The Greens.

Following the formation of the third cabinet of Federal Chancellor Angela Merkel, Schneider served as deputy chairman of the SPD parliamentary group under the leadership of Thomas Oppermann. He was also the chairman of the so-called Confidential Committee (Vertrauensgremium) of the Budget Committee, which provides budgetary supervision for Germany's three intelligence services, BND, BfV and MAD.

In addition, Schneider has been a delegate to the Conference established under Article 13 of the European Fiscal Compact since 2014; this body assembles members of the relevant committees of the European Parliament and national parliaments to discuss economic and fiscal policy and other matters concerning stability, coordination and governance in the Economic and Monetary Union of the European Union.

Following the 2017 election, Schneider succeeded Christine Lambrecht as First Secretary of the SPD parliamentary group, in this position assisting the group's chairwoman Andrea Nahles. In this capacity, he was also a member of the parliament's Council of Elders, which – among other duties – determines daily legislative agenda items and assigns committee chairpersons based on party representation.

Ahead of the 2021 elections, Schneider was elected to lead the SPD campaign in Thuringia for the fourth consecutive time.

Other activities
In addition to his political work, Schneider holds a number of paid and unpaid positions.

Corporate boards
 Germany Trade and Invest (GTAI), Ex-Officio Member of the Supervisory Board (since 2022)
 KfW, Member of the Board of Supervisory Directors (since 2010)
 Association of Sparda Banks, Member of the Advisory Board
 CNC Communications & Network Consulting, Member of the Board of Experts (since 2009)
 Stadtwerke Erfurt, Member of the Supervisory Board (2002-2006)

Non-profit organizations
 Federal Foundation for the Reappraisal of the SED Dictatorship, Member of the Board of Trustees (since 2022)
 Fraunhofer Society, Member of the Senate
 Friends of the Bauhaus Museum, Member of the Board of Trustees
 Federal Financial Supervisory Authority (BaFin), Alternate Member of the Administrative Council
 German-Brazilian Society (DBG), Member of the Board of Trustees (2013-2014)

Since 2001, Schneider has acted as chairman for “Erfurt Runs” (Erfurt rennt) a relay race around the Erfurt Cathedral to support tolerance and inclusion.  He is also a member of the board of trustees for the Bonn-based Community-Mindedness Campaign.

Political positions

Eurozone crisis management
Schneider has been critical of Chancellor Angela Merkel and her policy of bailouts for Greece and Cyprus. In August 2011, he publicly criticized Labor Minister Ursula von der Leyen for demanding collateral from euro-area members needing financial aid.

Schneider also criticized a possible bailout that would not punish foreign tax evaders storing their money in Cypriot banks. In April 2013, he helped build support among the SPD parliamentary group for the incumbent center-right government's move to contribute to a 10 billion euros international bailout of Cyprus that included losses for uninsured depositors in two of the island's banks.

In 2011, Schneider and his counterpart Norbert Barthle from the Conservative CDU urged Portugal to consider selling some of its gold reserves to ease debt woes and therefore reduce the cost to German taxpayers of bailing it out.

Banking sector
In an opinion piece for the Financial Times, he expressed doubt in Merkel and the CDU/CSU coalition's plan to begin to recapitalize banks involved in European sovereign-debt crisis, saying:

"A supervisory institution without the authority to wind up failing banks is, in effect, a guarantee of survival for big banks. The ESM would strengthen their capacity to blackmail the public."

In 2011, Schneider advocated a salary cap of 500,000 euros ($692,400) and a higher tax on bonus payments for bankers whose companies may need government help.

On the European Commission’s 2014 proposal for a structural reform of the EU banking sector, Schneider criticized the measures as insufficient and held that "separating certain risky business, such as credit to hedge funds, from banks' core business is a central lesson from the financial crisis".

Personal life
Schneider has been married since 2000. The couple has two children.

References 

Politicians from Erfurt
Living people
1976 births
Members of the Bundestag for Thuringia
Members of the Bundestag 2021–2025
Members of the Bundestag 2017–2021
Members of the Bundestag 2013–2017
Members of the Bundestag 2009–2013
Members of the Bundestag 2005–2009
Members of the Bundestag 2002–2005
Members of the Bundestag 1998–2002
Members of the Bundestag for the Social Democratic Party of Germany